Peter Slodowy (12 October 1948, in Leverkusen – 19 November 2002, in Bonn) was a German mathematician who worked on singularity theory and algebraic geometry.

He completed his Ph.D. thesis at the University of Regensburg in 1978 under the direction of Theodor Bröcker and Egbert Brieskorn. The Slodowy correspondence is named after him.

Publications

References
 

20th-century German mathematicians
1948 births
2002 deaths
University of Regensburg alumni